Vladimir Kuznetsov is a name of Russian origin.

It may refer to:

Vladimir Kuznetsov (diplomat) (born 1957), Russian diplomat; head of the United Nations Committee for Administrative and Budgetary Issues
Vladimir Kuznetsov (weightlifter, born 1984), Kazakhstani Olympic weightlifter
Vladimir Kuznetsov (weightlifter, born 1963), Soviet weightlifter
Vladimir Kuznetsov (water polo) (born 1937), Russian Olympic water polo player 
Vladimir Kuznetsov (javelin thrower) (1931–1986), Soviet javelin thrower
Vladimir Kuznetsov (footballer) (1938–2016), Soviet-Russian footballer, referee
Vladimir Kuznetsov (cyclist) (born 1945), Soviet cyclist
Vladimir Kuznetsov (prankster) (born 1986), best known as Vovan, Russian prankster
Vladimir Kuznetsov (politician) (born 1954), Russian politician

See also
Kuznetsov